Sami Ryhänen (born May 23, 1980) is a retired Finnish professional ice hockey centre. He played in the Finnish SM-liiga (the Finnish Elite League) for Lukko, SaiPa, Blues and Tappara.

He last played for Porvoo Hunters, who he would later coach between 2018 and 2019.

External links

1980 births
Living people
AaB Ishockey players
Almtuna IS players
Ducs de Dijon players
Dundee Stars players
Finnish ice hockey centres
Espoo Blues players
ESV Kaufbeuren players
SHC Fassa players
HC Salamat players
HDD Olimpija Ljubljana players
IF Björklöven players
Imatran Ketterä players
Lukko players
Nottingham Panthers players
SaiPa players
Stjernen Hockey players
Ritten Sport players
Swindon Wildcats players
Tappara players
Ice hockey people from Helsinki
Finnish expatriate ice hockey players in Sweden
Finnish expatriate ice hockey players in France
Finnish expatriate ice hockey players in Norway
Finnish expatriate ice hockey players in Slovenia
Finnish expatriate ice hockey players in Austria
Finnish expatriate ice hockey players in Italy
Finnish expatriate ice hockey players in Denmark
Finnish expatriate ice hockey players in Germany
Finnish expatriate ice hockey players in England
Finnish expatriate ice hockey players in Scotland
Finnish ice hockey coaches